The 2002–03 Mid-American Conference women's basketball season began with practices in October 2003, followed by the start of the 2002–03 NCAA Division I women's basketball season in November. Conference play began in January 2003 and concluded in March 2003. Ball State and Toledo shared the regular season title with a record of 12–4. Tamara Bowie of Ball State was MAC player of the year.

Fourth seeded Western Michigan won the MAC tournament over Ball State. Casey Rost of Western Michigan was the tournament MVP. Western Michigan lost to Stanford in the first round of the NCAA tournament. Ball State and Toledo played in the WNIT.

Preseason Awards 
The preseason poll was announced by the league office on October 23, 2002.

Preseason women's basketball poll 
(First place votes in parenthesis)

East Division 
  (24) 189
  (9) 174
  106
  100
  91
  33

West Division 
  (29) 225
  173
  162
  (4) 152
  100
  (9) 73
  39

Tournament Champion 
Kent State (15), Ball State (11), Miami (7)

Honors

Postseason

Mid–American Tournament

NCAA Tournament

Women's National Invitational Tournament

Postseason Awards 

Coach of the Year: Mark Ehlen, Toledo
Player of the Year: Tamara Bowie, Ball State
Freshman of the Year: Joi Scott, Northern Illinois
Defensive Player of the Year: Maria Jilian, Western Michigan
Sixth Man of the Year: Kim Lancaster, Miami

Honors

See also
2002–03 Mid-American Conference men's basketball season

References